Aegithalos is a songbird genus in the family Aegithalidae.

Taxonomy
The genus Aegithalos was introduced in 1804 by the French naturalist Johann Hermann to accommodate a single species, the long-tailed tit.  The genus name was a term used by Aristotle for some European tits, including the long-tailed tit.

Species

The genus contains following ten species:

Fossil record

Aegithalos gaspariki (Late Miocene of Polgardi, Hungary)  
Aegithalos congruis (Pliocene of Csarnota, Hungary)

References

 
Bird genera
Taxa named by Johann Hermann
Taxonomy articles created by Polbot